Pedro Valiente is a small village in the municipality of Tarifa in the Province of Cadiz in southern Spain. The Tarifa Kite School and Guzman House, a restaurant, are located here.
There are also numerous apartments in the vicinity.

References

Populated places in the Province of Cádiz
Tarifa